The Hong Kong Financial Reporting Standards, or HKFRSs for short, is a set of financial reporting standards issued by the Hong Kong Institute of Certified Public Accountants in Hong Kong.

It comprises a collection of standards, these include:
Hong Kong Financial Reporting Standard (HKFRS)
HKFRS Interpretation (HKFRS-Int)
Hong Kong Accounting Standards (HKAS)
HKAS Interpretation (HKAS-Int)

References

Accounting in Hong Kong
Accounting standards
Standards of the People's Republic of China